The Guns of the South is an alternate history novel set during the American Civil War by Harry Turtledove. It was released in the United States on September 22, 1992.

The story deals with a group of time-traveling white supremacist members of the Afrikaner Weerstandsbeweging (AWB) from an imagined 21st-century South Africa, who supply Robert E. Lee's Army of Northern Virginia with AK-47s and other advanced technology, medicine and intelligence. Their intervention results in a Confederate victory in the war. Afterwards, however, the AWB members discover that their ideas for the Confederate States and Lee's are not one and the same as they believed and the general and the men of the South have a violent falling out with the white supremacists from the future.

The book includes a fictionalized version of the real Civil War soldier Mollie Bean; she is cast as a prostitute who enlists to fight with a North Carolina regiment.

Plot

Alteration of the Civil War

In January 1864, the Confederate States is on the verge of losing the Civil War against the United States. Men with strange accents and oddly-mottled clothing approach Confederate General Robert E. Lee at the headquarters of the Army of Northern Virginia. They demonstrate a rifle far superior to all other firearms of the time, operating on chemical and engineering principles that are unknown to Confederate military engineers. They offer to supply the Confederate Army with the rifles, which they refer to as AK-47s. The men, who call their organization "America Will Break" (or "AWB"), establish a base in Rivington in Nash County, North Carolina, along with offices in the Confederate capital of Richmond, Virginia.

The AWB continues to offer inexplicable intelligence and technology to the Confederacy, including nitroglycerine tablets for treating Lee's heart condition. Finally, Lee questions their leader, Andries Rhoodie, who provides Lee a partially true explanation. The men of AWB are Afrikaner Neo-Nazi ultra-nationalists from post-apartheid South Africa, having traveled back 150 years from the year 2014 to change the outcome of the Civil War. The newcomers claim that white supremacy has not endured to the modern era and that blacks have marginalized whites. Lee is told that President Abraham Lincoln will act as a vicious tyrant during his second term and that his successor, Thaddeus Stevens, will continue his work to ensure that blacks will become the dominant political faction in the former Confederacy, as they outnumber whites in many areas. The AWB says that blacks will take over other countries, including the United Kingdom.

The AWB men train soldiers to use their new weapons and issue ammunition. With the AWB's guns and some direct military aid from the time-traveling Afrikaners, the Army of Northern Virginia drives Union General Ulysses S. Grant's forces out of Virginia. In a surprise night attack they capture Washington, thus ending the Civil War. Lincoln refuses to flee the capital during their advance and appears on the White House lawn, where he addresses them before personally surrendering to Lee. The United Kingdom and France recognize the Confederacy, and Lincoln is forced to accept the Confederate victory.

Events after Confederate victory

The two sides hold formal peace negotiations in Richmond, with Lee as one of the commissioners, to settle territorial disputes and Confederate demands for reparation. At the same time, the Union defeat in the war results in a four-way split in the 1864 presidential election, with Lincoln losing to New York Governor Horatio Seymour. After the election is decided, the Union reluctantly agrees to pay $90 million in gold (more than $1.4 billion in 2019) as reparations; the Confederacy, in turn, gives up any claim to Maryland and West Virginia. At Lee's suggestion, the border states of Kentucky and Missouri hold elections to decide their status; Kentucky joins the Confederacy, while Missouri remains in the Union.

Many Confederate slaves freed by the Union during the war who served in the Union Army continue to fight Confederate forces long after the Union formally surrenders. That frightens many Confederate whites and infuriates the troops charged with fighting them, particularly Nathan Bedford Forrest and his men. Lee, already dubious about slavery and respectful of the courage of the United States Colored Troops during the war, becomes convinced that continuing to enslave blacks is both morally wrong and ultimately impracticable. Despite threats from Rhoodie and the AWB, Lee makes no effort to hide his views.

At the urging and with the full backing of Jefferson Davis, who may not be re-elected under the Constitution of the Confederate States after his six-year term, Lee runs for President in the 1867 Confederate States presidential election, on a pro-abolition Confederate Party ticket with Senator Albert Gallatin Brown of Mississippi as his running mate. The Rivington men back the pro-slavery Patriot Party ticket of General Nathan Bedford Forrest and Senator Louis Wigfall of Texas, putting their considerable resources into Forrest's campaign. Lee achieves a narrow victory, defeating Forrest 69-50 in the Electoral College and by 32,000 popular votes out of 963,437 cast. Following his loss, Forrest concedes defeat.

AWB's betrayal

Soon after the election, Lee receives a history book that was stolen from the Rivington men from a former Confederate soldier, which covers the Civil War and the original outcome that was supposed to happen without the AWB's intervention. Enraged at the lies that Rhoodie had told him about the future, Lee confronts the AWB leader by using the modern history book as proof of Rhoodie's dishonesty, and compares his fanaticism to that of John Brown. Faced with the accusations, Rhoodie promises to show the AWB's true colors to Lee.

At Lee's inauguration on March 4, 1868, AWB men try to assassinate him by using Uzis, which results in the death of Lee's wife, Mary, Vice President Brown, various dignitaries and generals, and many civilians. Police forces seize the AWB offices in Richmond after a fierce battle. Lee enters the stronghold to find more technological marvels (such as fluorescent light bulbs and air conditioning), books that document the increasing marginalization of racism from 1865 into the 21st century, and the efforts made to improve race relations. Lee shows the books to the Confederate Congress, in the hope that the future's nearly universal condemnation of slavery and racism will convince them to vote for his plan for gradual abolition.

Confederate forces lay siege to Rivington and engage the AWB, which uses modern weaponry such as belt-fed machine guns, sniper rifles, mortars, barbed wire, and land mines to inflict heavy casualties on the Confederate forces. Ultimately, Confederate infantry destroy the AWB's time machine during the fighting and seize the town after they break through the AWB defenses. Those surviving AWB men who were unable to escape back to their own time lose hope and surrender.

In Richmond, the Confederate Congress narrowly passes President Lee's gradual emancipation bill. Pharmacists have copied the nitroglycerin pills brought by the AWB, and Lee hopes, with their help, to live to see the effects of his plan for emancipation. Several of the stranded Afrikaners agree to help the Confederacy replicate their 21st-century technology so that Lee can counter the Union in both its replica AK-47s and its greater industrial strength. Though the Confederacy has maintained strict neutrality in a war that the Union had started with the British Empire by invading Canada, Lee fears that the Union may later attempt a war of revenge against the Confederacy. He rests assured that the Confederacy will, however, remain the most technologically advanced country in the world for many decades to come.

Reception 
Kirkus gave a positive review, saying "Readers willing to wink at the time travel will find a well-researched and well-written account of a nation that didn't happen. Literate rebs will read it again and again and again."

Award

The book won the John Esten Cooke Award for Southern Fiction in 1993.

See also

 American Civil War alternate histories
 A Rebel in Time, another Civil War alternate history involving time travel and a racist sending advanced weapons to the Confederacy.
 "Still Valley", a The Twilight Zone episode focusing on the Civil War.
 Southern Victory, a series of books by Turtledove focused on a Confederate victory and its aftermath.

References

External links

 Americanisms in Harry Turtledove's The Guns of the South, Tatu Ahponen, 2003 (including detailed summary)
 2010 review by Jo Walton
 1994 Review by Mark Taha
 The Marble Man: The Guns of the South, The Lost Cause, and Harry Turtledove, Monroe Templeton, 2021

1992 American novels
Novels set during the American Civil War
American alternate history novels
Afrikaner Weerstandsbeweging
Books about apartheid
Fictional depictions of Abraham Lincoln in literature
Novels by Harry Turtledove
Novels about time travel
1992 science fiction novels
American Civil War alternate histories
Fiction set in 1864
Fiction set in 1868
Fiction set in 2014
Ballantine Books books